Marci Calabretta Cancio-Bello is an American poet, radio show producer, and professor.  She is the author of    Hour of the Ox, which won the 2015 AWP Donald Hall Prize for Poetry.

Education 
Cancio-Bello received her MFA in creative writing in 2014 from Florida International University and her BA in English in 2011 from Carnegie Mellon University.

Awards and honors 
 Kundiman Fellowship
 Academy of American Poets Prize
 James L. Knight Fellowship
 Best New Poets 2015

References 

American women poets
1989 births
Living people
21st-century American poets
21st-century American women writers